Gattaran, officially the Municipality of Gattaran, is a 1st class municipality in the province of Cagayan, Philippines. According to the 2020 census, it has a population of 58,874 people.

Gattaran's historic spots and tourist landmarks include the Lal-lo and Gattaran Shell Middens, Magapit Protected Landscape, Maduppaper Caves, the Mapaso Hot Spring and the Tanglagan Falls whose warm and cold waters meet and flow together on one bed to become the Dummun River. Another attraction of Gattaran is Bolos Point, a wildlife sanctuary.

Etymology

Traditionally known as 'Najiping' (now the town of Nassiping). In Fr. Jose Bugarin's Ibanag dictionary (orig. 1600's, but this excerpt taken from Lobato de Santo Tomas version 1854) called it 'Najjiping' from the Ibanag word for 'conjoined, twins'. "Najjiping, town of this province, named so for being where the big river, or Bannag [Cagayan River], and the small [lit. 'chico'] tributary or Itabes (Itawis) river meet."

In the Murillo Velarde Map (1734), towns in the area are identified as "Gatara" and "Nasipin".

History

In the place where Gattaran lies today were three former ecclesiastical towns: Nassiping, Dummun, and Gattaran proper. Nassiping is the oldest among the three, founded on June 15, 1596, with Santa Catalina as the patron saint; Dummun was founded on May 24, 1598, and Gattaran, May 20, 1623. Since each of these towns had few inhabitants and had only one priest to administer to their religious needs, they were merged for ecclesiastical convenience into one municipality in 1877 by virtue of a Diocesan Order from the Bishop of Nueva Segovia (Lallo). Fray Francisco Suejos, O.P. was the first Gobernadorcillo.

During the Spanish regime, the natives grew spiritually; but with the Americans, they grew educationally and the inhabitants assimilated a more sophisticated lifestyle. Under the Commonwealth Government, the first Municipal Mayor was Melencio Adviento, who begun the construction of the present municipal building. The building was finished during the term of the next mayor, Atty. Hipolito Mandac. The municipal building was inaugurated in September, 1941. Four months after its inauguration, World War II broke out, the Japanese Forces occupied the town and all records, cadastral titles and others were confiscated by the invading forces.

With the coming of the Americans to adding Filipino soldiers under the Philippine Commonwealth Army and Philippine Constabulary, the whole province was liberated from the Japanese forces. The first election of the Republic in 1947 made Delfino Liban the mayor. The administration marked the building of roads in the barrios, improvements of streets and others.

In 1950, the barrios of Gattaran to the west of the Cagayan River was separated to form the town of Lasam.

In the classical era, Gattaran used to be the home of hunter-gatherers who specialized in hunting mollusks. These hunter-gatherers have stockpiled their leftover mollusk shells in numerous sites in Gattaran and neighboring Lal-lo, until eventually, the shells formed into largest stock of shell-midden sites in the entire Philippines.

In 2006, the shell-midden sites of Gattaran and Lal-lo were included in the UNESCO Tentative List for World Heritage Site inclusion, a step closer to becoming a world heritage site. The shell-midden sites are currently being conserved by the local government from looting to preserve its outstanding universal value.

Geography

Barangays
Gattaran is politically subdivided into 50 barangays. These barangays are headed by elected officials: Barangay Captain, Barangay Council, whose members are called Barangay Councilors. All are elected every three years.

Climate

Demographics

Economy

Government
Gattaran, belonging to the first legislative district of the province of Cagayan, is governed by a mayor designated as its local chief executive and by a municipal council as its legislative body in accordance with the Local Government Code. The mayor, vice mayor, and the councilors are elected directly by the people through an election which is being held every three years.

Election officials

Education
The Schools Division of Cagayan governs the town's public education system. The division office is a field office of the DepEd in Cagayan Valley region. The office governs the public and private elementary and public and private high schools throughout the municipality.

References

External links
 [ Philippine Standard Geographic Code]
Philippine Census Information

Municipalities of Cagayan
Populated places on the Rio Grande de Cagayan